Epiphyas flebilis is a species of moth of the family Tortricidae. It is found in Australia, where it has been recorded from Tasmania. The habitat consists of wet eucalypt and mixed forests.

The wingspan is about 16 mm.

References

Moths described in 1939
Epiphyas